Kottamia Astronomical Observatory is the largest telescope in the Arab world, including the Middle East and North Africa. The telescope, which is located 80 km from the center of Cairo, has a main mirror diameter of about 1.88 meters.

The National Research Institute of Astronomy & Geophysics (NRIAG) of Egypt operates the Kottamia Observatory through its Astronomy Department.

References 

Astronomical observatories
Buildings and structures in Egypt